Royal Consort Suk-yong (died 1506), of the Heungdeok Jang clan, was the consort of Yeonsangun of Joseon. She is often compared with Jang Hui-bin and Jeong Nan-jeong, two other women of the Joseon dynasty. After the overthrow of Yeonsangun, she was executed by the new ruler, Jungjong of Joseon.

Biography
The royal consort’s name was Jang Nok-su (장녹수). Her father was Jang Han-pil a county magistrate who lived in the western part of Chungcheong Province and her mother was a concubine from the cheonmin class. Because of this, Jang Nok-su lived as a servant of the Grand Prince Jean, son of Yejong of Joseon and Queen Ansun. After having a son with Gano (가노, 家奴), another servant of Grand Prince Jean, she learned to sing and dance and became a kisaeng. She was only of ordinary beauty, but had a vibrant and youthful appearance, and possessed an extraordinary talent for singing and music.

One day, Yeonsangun heard her voice and appointed Jang Nok-su his concubine, sending lots of gifts and wealth to her family. Concubine Jang seemed to treat Yeonsangun as a baby, but he so favored her that all rulings and punishments were made under her influence. In 1503 Jang Nok-su became Royal Consort when she was elevated to the rank of Suk-yong. Based on the king's favor, her brother-in-law Kim Hyo-Son (husband of her sister) was given an official post.

Although Jang Nok-su lived in the palace, she destroyed her house to rebuild a new and a bigger house. In 1506, a group of officials plotted against the despotic ruler of Yeonsangun. King Yeonsangun was dethroned and sent into exile. The last moments of Jang Nok-su's life were miserable. She was beheaded publicly and many people threw rocks at her dead body.

Family
Father: Jang Han-pil (장한필, 張漢弼)
 Unnamed mother 
 Sibling(s)
Sister: Jang Bok-su (장복수, 張福壽)
Brother-in-law: Kim Hyo-son (김효손)
 Husband: Gano (가노, 家奴)
 Unnamed son
Husband: King Yeonsangun of Joseon (23 November 1476 – 20 November 1506) (조선 연산군)
Daughter: Princess Yi Yeong-Su (이영수) (1502 - ?)
Son-in-law: Kwon Han (권한, 權鷴)

In popular culture
 Portrayed by Kim Jin-ah in the 1988 film Diary of King Yeonsan.
 Portrayed by Kang Sung-yeon in the 2005 film The King and the Clown.
 Portrayed by Oh Soo-min in the 2007-2008 SBS TV series The King and I.
 Portrayed by Jeon So-min in the 2011-2012 JTBC TV series Insu, The Queen Mother.
 Portrayed by Cha Ji-yeon in the 2015 film The Treacherous.
 Portrayed by Lee Hanee in the 2017 MBC TV series The Rebel.
 Portrayed by Son Eun-seo in the 2017 KBS2 TV series Queen for Seven Days.

References

 

1506 deaths
Royal consorts of the Joseon dynasty
Executed Korean people
Deaths by decapitation
16th-century executions
16th-century Korean women